John Major formed the first Major ministry upon the resignation of Margaret Thatcher in November 1990, after being invited by Queen Elizabeth II to form the next administration. Major inherited a majority government.

Formation

The resignation of Margaret Thatcher as Prime Minister came on 22 November 1990, more than 11 years after she had first been elected. Former Cabinet minister Michael Heseltine had challenged her leadership earlier in November and although she fared better than him in the leadership contest, she was unable to gain an outright win and handed in her resignation, paving the way for a new Conservative leader more likely to win the next general election which was due within 18 months.

The announcement of the Community Charge (often referred to as the Poll Tax) during 1989 and the onset of a recession shortly before Thatcher's resignation had seen Tory support plunge in the opinion polls, most of which were showing a double-digit Labour lead and making it seem likely that Neil Kinnock would be the next Prime Minister.

Conservative MPs elected Chancellor of the Exchequer, John Major as their new leader on 27 November 1990, and he was invited by the Queen to form a majority government the following day.

Fate
The change of leader from Margaret Thatcher to John Major saw a revival in Tory support, with the double-digit lead in the opinion polls for the Labour Party being replaced by a narrow Conservative one by the turn of 1991. Although a general election did not have to be held until June 1992, Labour leader Neil Kinnock kept pressurising Major to hold an election during 1991, but Major resisted the calls and there was no election that year.

The recession which began in the autumn of 1990 deepened during 1991, with unemployment standing at nearly 2.5 million by December 1991, compared to 1.6 million just 18 months earlier. Despite this, Tory support in the opinion polls remained relatively strong, with any Labour lead now being by the narrowest of margins, although Labour still made some gains at the expense of the Tories in local elections, and seized the Monmouth seat from the Tories in a by-election.

Major finally called an election for 9 April 1992 which ended the first Major ministry. In a surprise to most pollsters, Major won the election, which led to the formation of the Second Major ministry and a fourth consecutive Conservative term in office.

Cabinet

November 1990 – April 1992

List of ministers
Members of the Cabinet are in bold face.

Notes

Footnotes

References

External links

British ministries
Government
1990s in the United Kingdom
1990 establishments in the United Kingdom
1992 disestablishments in the United Kingdom
Ministry 1
Ministries of Elizabeth II
Cabinets established in 1990
Cabinets disestablished in 1992